Louis Munteanu (born 16 June 2002) is a Romanian professional footballer who plays as a forward for Liga I club Farul Constanța, on loan from Fiorentina.

Personal life 
On 16 October 2020 he tested positive for COVID-19.

Career Statistics

Club

References

External links
 
 

2002 births
Living people
Sportspeople from Vaslui
Romanian footballers
Romania youth international footballers
Association football forwards
Liga I players
FC Viitorul Constanța players 
ACF Fiorentina players 
FCV Farul Constanța players 
Romanian expatriate footballers
Romanian expatriate sportspeople in Italy
Expatriate footballers in Italy